Anostoma, common name the up-mouth snails, is a genus of tropical air-breathing land snails, terrestrial pulmonate gastropod mollusks in the family Odontostomidae. Snails in this genus are found in Brazil.

Adult snails in this genus have an extremely unusual shell morphology: the aperture of the adult shell faces directly "upwards", in other words, in the same direction as the spire.  This seemingly impossible arrangement is made possible because the adult shell is carried upside down.

In 1901, the American malacologist Henry Augustus Pilsbry commented that the adult shell of Anostoma is "so bizarre that in the total absence of information upon its life history, no useful theory can be formulated to account for its peculiarities."

A very similar shell is found in the genus Ringicella Gray, 1847, which was previously considered to be merely a subgenus within Anostoma, but it is now considered to be a genus in its own right.

How the shell is carried 

This is one of the most peculiar genera of land snails. The prominent feature of an upturned aperture (causing the adult snail to carry the shell spire down) is reflected in its scientific name Anostoma: ano, means up, or backwards, and stoma means mouth, from the Greek.

In this genus, the adult snails carry the shell completely upside down, with the umbilicus uppermost, and the spire facing downwards. To make this extraordinary feat possible, the mature aperture of the shell is aligned in the same plane as the rather low spire of the shell.

It appears that in juveniles, the shell is carried with the widest diameter vertically aligned, in other words, with the keel of the shell pointing up.

Shell description 
The width of adult shells varies from 23 to 45 mm.

Thomas Wyatt (1838) wrote about Anostoma: "An extraordinary shell, sometimes called the antique lamp from its form. Shell orbicular, the spire convex and obtuse; aperture round, toothed within, grinning, turned upward to the spire; margin reflected."

The shell of Anostoma is heliciform, biconvex, solid, the axis hollow, but imperforate in the adult stage. The shell is composed of few whorls, the last straightened, turning toward the margin and upward.

Before the last half whorl is formed, the shell is umbilicate, and judging by the growth-lines, the juvenile and subadult shell is carried with the equatorial plane nearly vertical. However, as the last half whorl starts to form, the direction of growth changes: it tilts to the right, not to the left as in the Helicidae, and subsequently that half whorl grows up across the base of the shell. The final aperture in the adult is slightly above the keel or widest diameter of the shell.

The apex of the shell is smooth and somewhat flattened. The peristome is expanded and reflexed. The semicircular aperture is turned upward, obstructed by numerous lamellae and folds. In the aperture of Anostoma, the primitive condition of the parietal armature remains, the angular, parietal and infraparietal lamellae being all present and separate. In Anostoma the parietal lamella is the longest while in other Odontostomini the infraparietal lamella is the longest. The "teeth" of the aperture are entirely homologous with those of Odontostomus.

The similar genus Ringicella has an additional feature on its shell: the angular lamella and upper suprapalatal fold are concrescent and form a perforation in the lip at its upper end.

Anatomy 
Pilsbry described the anatomy of what is now known as Ringicella ringens. At the time that species was described as an Anostoma,  and Pilsbry (who was very thorough) did not make any comments that implied that there was any difference between the anatomy of that species and that of any of the other Anostoma species he examined. Thus, see Ringicella#Anatomy.

Anatomy of Anostoma depressum was examined by Harold Heath in 1914.

Distribution 
This  genus of snails occurs in Brazil.

Species 

Species within this genus include:
 Anostoma baileyi Solem, 1956
 Anostoma brunneum Verdcourt, 1991
 Anostoma carinatum Pfeiffer, 1853
 Anostoma depressum (Lamarck, 1822)
 Anostoma deshayesianum Fischer, 1857
 Anostoma octodentatum Fischer von Waldheim, 1807 - Brazilian up-mouth snail. This is the type species for the genus. The type locality is tropical South America, east of the Andes.
 Anostoma octodentatum verreauxianum Hupé, 1857 (photo)
 Anostoma rossi Weber, 1925
 Anostoma tessa Simone, 2012
 Anostoma verreauxianum Hupé, 1856

Synonyms 

Very similar to the genus Anostoma, the taxon Ringicella is currently considered to be a genus in its own right. Species that are now in the genus Ringicella were previously included in the genus Anostoma.

Synonyms:
 Anostoma carinatum Pfeiffer, 1853 is now a synonym for Ringicella carinatum (Pfeiffer, 1853)
 Anostoma luetzelburgi (Weber, 1925) is now a synonym for Ringicella luetzelburgi (Weber, 1925)
 Anostoma ringens (Linnaeus, 1758), Anostoma globulosa Lamarck, 1822 and Anostoma globulosum Lamarck, 1822 are all synonyms for Ringicella ringens (Linnaeus, 1758).

References 
This article incorporates public domain text from reference.

External links 

 A  photo of a live animal of Anostoma octodentatum seen from above

Odontostomidae